Hypsopygia thymetusalis, the spruce needleworm moth or paler dolichomia moth, is a species of snout moth in the genus Hypsopygia. It was described by Francis Walker in 1859 and is found in the northeastern United States and adjoining Canada west to British Columbia.

The wingspan is about 22 mm. Adults are rose to violet colored with triangular, yellow costal patches.

The larvae feed on Picea species. They roll the leaves of their host plant.

References

Moths described in 1859
Pyralini